Islay Herald of Arms is a Scottish herald of arms of the Court of the Lord Lyon.

The office was first mentioned in 1493. Islay is an island off the west coast of Scotland and was the headquarters of the Lord of the Isles.  When the influence of that powerful noble was broken by the King of Scots during the fifteenth century, several names associated with the Lord of the Isles were absorbed and used by the crown.

The badge of office is Two salmon hauriant embowed Proper encircling a lymphad sails furled oars in action two armed men on deck sinister Sable by a flag Gules ensigned of the Crown of Scotland Proper.

The office is currently held by Yvonne Holton.

Holders of the office

See also
 Officer of Arms
 Herald
 Court of the Lord Lyon
 Heraldry Society of Scotland

References

External links
 



Court of the Lord Lyon
Offices of arms